Blue Ridge is a city in Fannin County, Georgia, United States. As of the 2020 census, the city had a population of 1,253. The city is the county seat of Fannin County.

History
Prior to European colonization, the area that is now Blue Ridge was inhabited by the Cherokee people and other Indigenous peoples for thousands of years.

Blue Ridge was laid out in 1886 when the Marietta and North Georgia Railroad was extended to that point. It was incorporated in 1887. In 1895, the seat of Fannin County was transferred to Blue Ridge from Morganton.

Geography
The city of Blue Ridge is located south of the center of Fannin County at  (34.868344, -84.320991). The city sits on the divide between the Tennessee River watershed to the north (via the Toccoa River) and the Alabama River to the south (via Crooked Log Creek, the Ellijay River, and several downstream rivers).

U.S. Route 76 and Georgia State Route 515 (Zell Miller Mountain Parkway) pass through the west side of the city, leading east  to Blairsville and southwest  to Ellijay. Georgia State Route 5 leads north from Blue Ridge  to McCaysville at the Tennessee line.

Climate

Demographics

2020 census

As of the 2020 United States census, there were 1,253 people, 476 households, and 249 families residing in the city.

2010 census
As of the 2010 United States Census, there were 1,290 people residing in the city. The racial makeup of the city was 92.1% White, 1.2% Black, 0.2% Native American, 0.5% Asian, 0.7% from some other race and 0.9% from two or more races. 4.5% were Hispanic or Latino of any race.

As of the census of 2000, there were 1,210 people, 553 households, and 319 families residing in the city. The racial makeup of the city was 98.26% White, 0.41% African American, 0.41% Asian, 0.17% from other races, and 0.74% from two or more races. Hispanic or Latino of any race were 0.83% of the population.

There were 553 households, out of which 25.1% had children under the age of 18 living with them, 38.9% were married couples living together, 15.9% had a female householder with no husband present, and 42.3% were non-families. 38.2% of all households were made up of individuals, and 19.7% had someone living alone who was 65 years of age or older. The average household size was 2.14 and the average family size was 2.81.

In the city, the population was spread out, with 22.3% under the age of 18, 9.8% from 18 to 24, 23.9% from 25 to 44, 25.2% from 45 to 64, and 18.8% who were 65 years of age or older. The median age was 39 years. For every 100 females, there were 83.3 males. For every 100 females age 18 and over, there were 80.8 males.

The median income for a household in the city was $28,214, and the median income for a family was $35,259. Males had a median income of $25,859 versus $17,941 for females.

The per capita income for the city was $16,149. About 13.7% of families and 17.0% of the population were below the poverty line, including 22.9% of those under age 18 and 16.6% of those age 65 or over.

LGBT community
In the late 2000s and continuing through the 2010s, the city has seen a surge in new business, particularly from the LGBT community which constitutes a larger percentage of the population than is typical for a rural community and one of the highest in Georgia.

Despite some recent reports of Blue Ridge rivaling Atlanta as the most LGBT-friendly city in Georgia, there are notable facts that challenge this notion.

In 2019, heavy opposition followed students wanting to create a Gay-Straight Alliance club at Fannin County High School. In contrast, hundreds of public high school students in the Atlanta area are active members of Gay-Straight Alliance clubs and this has been commonplace for decades.

In 2016, notable backlash came from the local community over Fannin County High School considering to allow transgender students utilize restrooms that match their gender identity.  During a Fannin County Board of Education meeting discussing the matter, a 2012 transgender graduate of the high school stated he was often beaten and harassed by students who were strangely consumed and misinformed about his identity.  Throughout the meeting, hundreds cheered on speakers who called LGBT people "perverts" and "pedophiles".

Education

Fannin County School District 
The Fannin County School District holds pre-school to grade twelve, and consists of three elementary schools, a middle school, and a high school. The district has 179 full-time teachers and more than 3,212 students.
Blue Ridge Elementary School
East Fannin Elementary School
West Fannin Elementary School
Fannin County Middle School
Fannin County High School

UNG Blue Ridge campus 
In 2015, the University of North Georgia (UNG) opened a campus in Blue Ridge.

Notable people
Lake Underwood, entrepreneur, inventor, and racecar owner and driver
Mark Wills, country singer

References

External links

City of Blue Ridge official website
Fannin County Chamber of Commerce
The News Observer
Blue Ridge Scenic Railway

Cities in Georgia (U.S. state)
Cities in Fannin County, Georgia
County seats in Georgia (U.S. state)